Choi Young-Nam (born 27 July 1984) is a South Korean football player who plays as a fullback or centerback.

After graduating from university, Choi began his career at Korea National League side Ulsan Hyundai Mipo Dockyard. On 17 November 2009, Gangwon called him as a second order pick during the 2010 K-League Draft. His first K-League match was against Seongnam Ilhwa Chunma in Seongnam on 27 February 2010, which Gangwon lost 0-3. In July 2010, he moved back to Korea National League side Ulsan Hyundai Mipo Dockyard, his previous club.

Honours

Club
Ulsan Hyundai Mipo Dockyard
Korea National League (2) : 2007, 2008
Korean President's Cup (1) : 2008

Club career statistics 

Note: appearances and goals include championship playoffs.

References

External links
 K-League player record 

1984 births
Living people
Association football defenders
South Korean footballers
Gangwon FC players
Ulsan Hyundai Mipo Dockyard FC players
K League 1 players
Korea National League players
K3 League players
Ajou University alumni